Michael Quinn may refer to:

Academics 
Michael Quinn (academic) (1922–2009), American academic and president of Saint Mary's College of California
D. Michael Quinn (1944–2021), American historian
Michael Quinn Patton (born 1945), American sociologist

Performers 
Mick Quinn (born 1969), English musician 
Mike Quinn (puppeteer) (born 1964), English puppeteer and animator

Sportspeople 
Michael Quinn (cricketer) (born 1962), Australian cricketer
Michael Quinn (footballer) (born 1990), Gaelic football convert to Australian rules football
Michael Quinn (Paralympian) (born 1963), Australian Paralympian
Mick Quinn (rugby union) (born 1952), Irish former rugby union footballer
Micky Quinn (born 1962), former English footballer, mainly for Portsmouth and Newcastle United
Mike Quinn (born 1974), former American football quarterback
Mike Quinn (ice hockey) (1874–1923), Canadian ice hockey coach and executive

Other 
Michael Quinn (American politician), member of the Connecticut House of Representatives
Michael Quinn (Australian politician) (1900–1965), Australian politician
Michael Quinn (chef) (19??–2017), chef and charity worker
Michael Quinn (judge), Irish High court judge and former solicitor
Michael Joseph Francis Quinn, Canadian politician
Michael Quinn Sullivan (born 1970), Texan columnist